District is a district consisting of 168 islands in the East China Sea, and is under the jurisdiction of prefecture-level city of Wenzhou, in southern Zhejiang province, China. It was known as Dongtou County until 2 September 2015, when, with the approval of the State Council, it was converted to a district.

Transport
It is served by 4 stations on Line S1 (Wenzhou Metro): Lingkun, Oujiangkou, Ouhua and Shuang'ou Avenue.

Administrative divisions
Subdistricts:
Bei'ao Subdistrict (北岙街道), Yuanjue Subdistrict (元觉街道), Dongping Subdistrict (东屏街道), Niyu Subdistrict (霓屿街道)

The only town is Damen (大门镇), and the only township is Luxi Township (鹿西乡)

Climate

Economy

References

External links

Island counties of China
Districts of Zhejiang
Geography of Wenzhou